The A1 Ethniki, often referred to as the Greek Water Polo League, is the highest professional water polo league in Greece. It is run by the Hellenic Swimming Federation. It is considered one of the top national leagues in European water polo, as its clubs have made significant success in European competitions. 

Ethnikos is the team with the most championships, having 38. Ethnikos also has the record for consecutive championships, with 18.

History 
 1923-27: Panhellenic Championship (held by SEGAS)
 1927–28 to 1965-66: Panhellenic Championship (held by Hellenic Swimming Federation)
 1966–67 to 1985-86: A Ethniki (held by Hellenic Swimming Federation)
 1986–87 to present: A1 Ethniki (held by Hellenic Swimming Federation)

Title holders 

 1922–23  Peiraikos
 1925–26  Ethnikos Piraeus
 1926–27  Olympiacos Piraeus
 1927–28  Aris Thessaloniki
 1928–29  Aris Thessaloniki (2)
 1929–30  Aris Thessaloniki (3)
 1930–31  Ethnikos Piraeus (2)
 1931–32  Aris Thessaloniki (4)
 1932–33  Olympiacos Piraeus (2)
 1933–34  Olympiacos Piraeus (3)
 1934–35  NO Patras
 1935–36  Olympiacos Piraeus (4)
 1936–37  NO Patras (2)
 1937–38  NO Patras (3)
 1938–39  NO Patras (4)
 1939–40  NO Patras (5)
 1941–44 Not held due to WW II
 1944–45  NO Patras (6)
 1945–46  NO Patras (7)
 1946–47  Olympiacos Pireaus (5)
 1947–48  Ethnikos Piraeus (3)
 1948–49  Olympiacos Piraeus (6)
 1949–50  NO Patras (8)
 1950–51  Olympiacos Piraeus (7)
 1951–52  Olympiacos Piraeus (8)
 1952–53  Ethnikos Piraeus (4)
 1953–54  Ethnikos Piraeus (5)
 1954–55  Ethnikos Piraeus (6)
 1955–56  Ethnikos Piraeus (7)
 1956–57  Ethnikos Piraeus (8)
 1957–58  Ethnikos Piraeus (9)
 1958–59  Ethnikos Piraeus (10)
 1959–60  Ethnikos Piraeus (11)
 1960–61  Ethnikos Piraeus (12)
 1961–62  Ethnikos Piraeus (13)
 1962–63  Ethnikos Piraeus (14)
 1963–64  Ethnikos Piraeus (15)
 1964–65  Ethnikos Piraeus (16)
 1965–66  Ethnikos Piraeus (17)
 1966–67  Ethnikos Piraeus (18)
 1967–68  Ethnikos Piraeus (19)
 1968–69  Ethnikos Piraeus (20) &  Olympiacos Piraeus (9)
 1969–70  Ethnikos Piraeus (21)
 1970–71  Olympiacos Piraeus (10)
 1971–72  Ethnikos Piraeus (22)
 1972–73  Ethnikos Piraeus (23)
 1973–74  Ethnikos Piraeus (24)
 1974–75  Ethnikos Piraeus (25)
 1975–76  Ethnikos Piraeus (26)
 1976–77  Ethnikos Piraeus (27)
 1977–78  Ethnikos Piraeus (28)
 1978–79  Ethnikos Piraeus (29)
 1979–80  Ethnikos Piraeus (30)
 1980–81  Ethnikos Piraeus (31)
 1981–82  Ethnikos Piraeus (32)
 1982–83  Ethnikos Piraeus (33)
 1983–84  Ethnikos Piraeus (34)
 1984–85  Ethnikos Piraeus (35)
 1985–86  ANO Glyfada
 1986–87  ANO Glyfada (2)
 1987–88  Ethnikos Piraeus (36)
 1988–89  ANO Glyfada (3)
 1989–90  ANO Glyfada (4)
 1990–91  NO Vouliagmeni 
 1991–92  Olympiacos Piraeus (11)
 1992–93  Olympiacos Piraeus (12)
 1993–94  Ethnikos Piraeus (37)
 1994–95  Olympiacos Piraeus (13)
 1995–96  Olympiacos Piraeus (14)
 1996–97  NO Vouliagmeni (2)
 1997–98  NO Vouliagmeni (3)
 1998–99  Olympiacos Piraeus (15)
 1999–00  Olympiacos Piraeus (16)
 2000–01  Olympiacos Piraeus (17)
 2001–02  Olympiacos Piraeus (18)
 2002–03  Olympiacos Piraeus (19)
 2003–04  Olympiacos Piraeus (20)
 2004–05  Olympiacos Piraeus (21)
 2005–06  Ethnikos Piraeus (38)
 2006–07  Olympiacos Piraeus (22)
 2007–08  Olympiacos Piraeus (23)
 2008–09  Olympiacos Piraeus (24)
 2009–10  Olympiacos Piraeus (25)
 2010–11  Olympiacos Piraeus (26)
 2011–12  NO Vouliagmeni (4)
 2012–13  Olympiacos Piraeus (27)
 2013–14  Olympiacos Piraeus (28)
 2014–15  Olympiacos Piraeus (29)
 2015–16  Olympiacos Piraeus (30)
 2016–17  Olympiacos Piraeus (31)
 2017–18  Olympiacos Piraeus (32)
 2018–19  Olympiacos Piraeus (33)
 2019–20  Olympiacos Piraeus (34)
 2020–21  Olympiacos Piraeus (35)
 2021–22  Olympiacos Piraeus (36)

Titles by club 
 
* The 1969 Championship was shared between Olympiacos and Ethnikos

Consecutive championships 

18 in a row 

  Ethnikos Piraeus→1953-1970

14 in a row 

  Ethnikos Piraeus→1972-1985 

10 in a row 

  Olympiacos Piraeus→2013

9 in a row  

  Olympiacos Piraeus→1999-2005

6 in a row 

  NO Patras→1937-1946

5 in a row 

  Olympiacos Piraeus→2007-2011

3 in a row 

  Aris Thessaloniki→1928-1930

2 in a row

  Olympiacos→1933-1934, 1951-1952, 1992-1993, 1995-1996

  ANO Glyfada→1986-1987, 1989-1990

  NO Vouliagmeni→1997-1998

Appearances in A' Ethniki (1967―2023) 
A' Ethniki (National Division) started in 1967, but the Greek championship started in 1923 as a Panhellenic Championship. The Hellenic Swimming Federation declares all championship winning teams as champions from 1928 and onwards. Teams in bold participate in the 2022–23 season.

Greek clubs in European competitions

References

External links
Hellenic Swimming Federation 
Eleftherotypia
Star Channel
Novasport Fm

Water polo competitions in Greece
Greece
Professional sports leagues in Greece
Water polo